The University of the Commonwealth Caribbean is one of Jamaica's largest privately held tertiary education institutions operating 7 campuses: in six parishes across Jamaica.

As of 2017, the University offers professional certificate, diploma, associate, bachelor's and master's degree programs, as well as customized training programs in Jamaica.

History 
UCC was formed in 2004 as a result of the merger in 2002 of the Institute of Management Sciences (IMS), incorporated in 1992, and the Institute of Management & Production (IMP), incorporated in 1976.

Accreditation 
The University of the Commonwealth Caribbean is registered and recognized by the University Council of Jamaica (UCJ), the official accreditation body for tertiary education in Jamaica. UCC is institutionally accredited by the University Council of Jamaica. and also has international institutional accreditation status from the UK based Accreditation Services for Independent Colleges & Universities (ASIC).

The UCC is also recognised as a registered centre from the University of London.

Affiliates and partnerships 

UCC currently partners with universities, colleges, institutions and schools across the globe.
As of February 2017, the University of the Commonwealth Caribbean is partnered with:
 Caribbean School of Medical Sciences, Jamaica
 Commonwealth of Learning
 eMedia Jamaica 
 Florida International University
 Law College of the Americas
 University of London

References

External links 
 

Universities in Jamaica
Educational institutions established in 2004
Education in Kingston, Jamaica
Buildings and structures in Kingston, Jamaica
2004 establishments in Jamaica